Adansonia gregorii, commonly known as the boab and also known by a number of other names, is a tree in the family Malvaceae, endemic to the northern regions of Western Australia and the Northern Territory of Australia.

Names

The specific name "gregorii" honours the Australian explorer Augustus Gregory.

The common name "boab" is a shortened form of the generic common name "boa", and is the most widely recognised common name It does, however, have a large number of other common names. Similar names include:
 baobab — the common name for the genus as a whole, but often used in Australia to refer to the Australian species
 Australian baobab
 boabab was in common use from the late 1850s (Perhaps the origin of boab)
 baob

Gadawon is one of the names used by the local Aboriginal Australian groups. Other names include larrgadi or larrgadiy, which is widespread in the Nyulnyulan languages of the Western Kimberley.

Other names include:
 bottle tree or bottletree
 cream of tartar tree
 gourd-gourd tree
 gouty stem tree
 monkey bread tree
 sour gourd
 upside down tree
 monkey bread tree
 dead rat tree

Habitat
Endemic to Australia, boab occurs in the Kimberley region of Western Australia and east into the Northern Territory.  It is the only baobab to occur in Australia, the others being native to Madagascar and mainland Africa and the Arabian Peninsula. There are various theories as to how the tree got to Australia, with A. Gregorii and Adansoia digitata, its African relative, being very similar genetically.

Description

As with other baobabs, Adansonia gregorii is easily recognised by the swollen base of its trunk, which forms a massive caudex, giving the tree a bottle-like appearance. 

The inner surface is densely sericeous.

Boabs are pollinated by the convolvulus hawk-moth Agrius convolvuli.

The tree's bark has a remarkable property, in that it can maintain inscribed markings for long periods of time, over more than a century. Some specimens of the African relative of boabs have been estimated to live close to 2,000 years, but the Australian ones are not as well-documented.

Uses

The plant has a wide variety of uses; most parts are edible and it is the source of a number of materials. Its medicinal products and the ability to store water through dry seasons has been exploited. They also use the white powder that fills the seed pods (or pith, said to taste like sherbet or cream of tartar) as a food.

Decorative paintings or carvings were sometimes made on the outer surface of the fruit.

The bark and leaves are used medicinally, in particular for digestive ailments.

The root fibres are used to create string.

The 1889 book Useful native plants of Australia states that "The dry acidulous pulp of the fruit is eaten. It has an agreeable taste, like cream of tartar".

European use of the trees has included letter boxes and jails.

The leaves may see a future use prepared as food, due to their high iron content. The leaves can be boiled and eaten as a spinach; the seeds can be ground and used as a coffee-like beverage, and fermenting the pulp creates a type of beer.

Notable trees

A large hollow boab south of Derby, Western Australia is reputed to have been used in the 1890s as a lockup for Aboriginal prisoners on their way to Derby for sentencing. The Boab Prison Tree, Derby is now a tourist attraction.

Another hollow boab near Wyndham, Western Australia was also used as a prison tree. The Hillgrove Lockup or Wyndham Prison Tree is on the King River Road out of Wyndham near the Moochalabra Dam. There is also a boab tree located within the Wyndham Caravan Park that is billed as "the biggest boab in captivity".

Gija Jumulu is a large boab which was transported from Warmun in the Kimberley region to Kings Park in the Western Australian capital city, Perth in 2008.  the tree was growing well, after an initial period showing signs of stress after the move, demonstrating the adaptability of the species in a different climate.

Gregory's Tree, in the Gregory's Tree Historical Reserve at Timber Creek, NT, is an Aboriginal sacred site and a registered Australian heritage site. The boab tree marks the site of a camp of the explorer Augustus Charles Gregory, and is inscribed with the dates of his party's arrival and departure, from October 1855 to July 1856.

Dendroglyphs
In 2021, a collaborative project to find and trace histories etched in boab trees in the Kimberley was launched. Funded by the Australian Research Council, archaeologists from the Australian National University (ANU), the University of Western Australia, the University of Canberra, and University of Notre Dame Australia are working with Aboriginal communities and using advanced technology (photogrammetry) to record 3D images of carvings on the trees. It is "the first systematic survey and recording program of carved boab trees in Australia".

In October 2022, the team published the results of their recent survey of such trees in the Tanami Desert. The survey records the tree markings, also known as dendroglyphs, relating to the Lingka Dreaming track across the desert. Also known as the King Brown Snake dreaming, many of the carvings are of snakes, but also include emu and kangaroo tracks; geometric markings; and, further west, crocodiles, turtles and Wanjina figures. The researchers also found stone artefacts and broken grinding stones, used for grinding seeds, as camps were often made underneath the large shady trees.

In film
A boab tree is featured in the 1992 animated film FernGully: The Last Rainforest to imprison the film's antagonist, Hexxus.

The boab tree is celebrated in the end credits of the 2008 film Australia with the song "By the Boab Tree", a song nominated for a 2008 Satellite Award, with lyrics by Baz Luhrmann and performed by Sydney singer Angela Little.

Gallery

References

Works cited

External links

  Photographs of the Australian Boab – Adansonia gregorii (Includes photographs of both prison trees).
  Photograph by M.E. McCombe ca.1917-1925.

Flora of the Northern Territory
gregorii
Drought-tolerant trees
Trees of Australia
Caudiciform plants
Fruits originating in Australia
Taxa named by Ferdinand von Mueller